Marion Male Academy, also known as Marion Male High School, is a historic school building located at Marion, Smyth County, Virginia. It was built in 1876, and is a two-story, five bay, hipped roof, Italianate style brick building. The school closed in 1893, with the construction of the Marion Public High School.  In 1901, it was renovated for residential use.

It was listed on the National Register of Historic Places in 1989. It is located in the Marion Historic District.

References

School buildings on the National Register of Historic Places in Virginia
Italianate architecture in Virginia
School buildings completed in 1876
Schools in Smyth County, Virginia
National Register of Historic Places in Smyth County, Virginia
Individually listed contributing properties to historic districts on the National Register in Virginia